Ateist (lit.  «Atheist») was an antireligious monthly journal in Russian, which was published from 1922 to 1930 in the RSFSR and the USSR.

The scientific society «Ateist» arose in 1921 in Moscow, on the initiative of P. A. Krasikov and I. A. Shpitsberg in order to promote the best works on criticizing religion. Shpitsberg became the editor-in-chief of the journal. The first two issues of the publication «Atheist» were printed in the form of a newspaper in 1922, in February and March. The format of the newspaper was considered uncomfortable and it was decided to publish a journal. From April 1922 to April 1925 the journal did not go out. The numbers of the journal from 1 to 59 were published from 1925 to 1930. 59 issue of the journal was the last. The main objective of the journal is to highlight the problem of the history of religion and the history of atheism, to print the chronicle of the spread of atheism in the USSR and abroad, as well as translations (including bourgeois scholars) about religion and the church.

The journal declared that it was ready to render all possible assistance to atheists.

Editorial Board of the journal: N. Rumyantsev, V. Shishakov, E. Fedorov-Greekulov, I. Voronitsyn, professor S. A. Kamenev, professor S. G. Lozinsky, professor V. T. Dityakin and I. A. Shpitsberg (editor-in-chief). The circulation of the journal is 4,000 copies. The slogan of the journal, which was printed on the front page: «Religion is a datura for the people». Author of the logo of the publishing house and journal: Dmitry Moor. "Ateist" Publisher was at the address: Moscow, Granatny Lane, house 1. The bookstore was located at: Malaya Nikitskaya Street, house 12.

The objectives of the journal were:
 1. ideological struggle with religion, as an ideological superstructure, unscientific and harmful to the working masses.
 2. the struggle with the organization of churchmen, both with political power, which uses the religious superstitions of all cults in its oppressive purposes

League of Militant Atheists began publishing a journal «Voinstvuiuschii ateizm» (lit.  «Militant Atheism») in 1931. This journal was a replacement for the journal «Ateist».

See also 

 Bezbozhnik (newspaper)
 Revolution and Church
 Council for Religious Affairs
 Culture of the Soviet Union
 Demographics of the Soviet Union
 Persecutions of the Catholic Church and Pius XII
 Persecution of Christians in the Soviet Union
 Persecution of Christians in Warsaw Pact countries
 Persecution of Muslims in the former USSR
 Red Terror
 Religion in Russia
 Religion in the Soviet Union
 Society of the Godless
 Soviet Orientalist studies in Islam
 State atheism
 USSR anti-religious campaign (1917–1921)
 USSR anti-religious campaign (1921–1928)
 USSR anti-religious campaign (1928–1941)
 USSR anti-religious campaign (1958–1964)
 USSR anti-religious campaign (1970s–1990)

References

Notes 
«Православие : Словарь атеиста» / [Беленкин И. Ф. и др.]. / Под общей редакцией доктора философских наук  Н. С. Гордиенко/  - М. : Политиздат, 1988. - 270,[2] с.; 17 см.;  / С. 32
 Журнал "Атеист"
 Издательство «Атеист»
 Журнал "Атеист" (3 фото)
 Издательство «Атеист»
 Атеизм
 Журнал "АТЕИСТ"-1925

Magazines established in 1922
1930 disestablishments in the Soviet Union
Magazines published in Moscow
1922 establishments in Russia
Magazines disestablished in 1930
Monthly magazines published in Russia
Atheism publications
Magazines published in the Soviet Union
Russian-language magazines
Propaganda in the Soviet Union
Anti-religious campaign in the Soviet Union
Propaganda newspapers and magazines
Religious persecution by communists